is the title of the sixth single by the Hello! Project unit Buono!. The title song is the second song used for the ending theme of Shugo Chara!! Doki—.

The single was released on January 21, 2009 in Japan under the Pony Canyon label in two different versions: regular and limited.

The Single V version was released on February 4, 2009 titled .

Track listing

CD 
 
 
 "co•no•mi•chi (Instrumental)"
 "Muteki no Mugendai Power (Instrumental)"

Single V DVD 
 "co•no•mi•chi <Music Clip>"
 "co•no•mi•chi <Close Up Version>"
 "co•no•mi•chi <Dance Shot Version>"

Oricon rank and sales

Television performances 
 Music Japan (January 22, 2009)
 Music Fighter (January 23, 2009)

References

External links 
 "Co-no-Mi-chi" entries on the Hello! Project official website: CD, Single V DVD 

2009 singles
Shugo Chara!
Buono! songs
Song recordings produced by Tsunku
2009 songs
Pony Canyon singles
Song articles with missing songwriters